Peirse may refer to:

People with the surname
Henry Peirse (1750s-1824), English politician
Richard Peirse (Royal Navy officer) (1860-1940), English Royal Navy officer
Richard Peirse (1892-1970), English RAF commander
Richard Peirse (RAF officer) (1931-2014), English RAF officer
Sarah Peirse, New Zealand actress

People with the double-barrelled name
Beresford-Peirse baronets
Noel Beresford-Peirse (1887-1953), British Army officer

See also 
 Peirce (disambiguation)
 Pierse
 Piers (disambiguation)
 Pierce (disambiguation)